Bobb'e Says is a live-action clip series hosted by Bobb'e J. Thompson that aired on Cartoon Network from August 19, 2009, to September 23, 2009. In the series Thompson provided commentary about video clips that aired as part of the episode. It was part of the CN Real block, and premiered the same day as another series, Dude, What Would Happen. Bobb'e Says is Cartoon Network's shortest lived live-action series along with BrainRush, both only running for six episodes. The entire series was available for purchase on the iTunes Store at one point, but has since been delisted and is currently lost media with exception towards episode one.

Episodes

Season 1 (2009)

References

External links
 

Cartoon Network original programming
2009 American television series debuts
2009 American television series endings
2000s American black television series
2000s American video clip television series
English-language television shows
Television series about teenagers